The 1989 Phoenix Cardinals season was the franchise’s 70th year with the National Football League (NFL) and the second season in Phoenix. With five games to go in the season, fourth-year coach Gene Stallings announced he would resign at the end of the season. Instead, general manager Larry Wilson ordered Stallings to leave immediately and named running backs coach Hank Kuhlmann as interim coach for the rest of the season. The Cardinals were 5–5 through ten games but would finish the season on a six-game losing streak, which would knock them out of the playoffs.

Offseason

NFL draft

Supplemental draft

Personnel

Staff

Roster

Regular season 
In week 10, Tim McDonald returned an interception 53 yards for a touchdown to beat the Dallas Cowboys.

Schedule

Game Summaries

Week 2: at Seattle Seahawks

Standings

Records 
 Rich Camarillo, NFL Punting Leader

References

External links 
 1989 Phoenix Cardinals at Pro-Football-Reference.com

Phoenix Cardinals
Arizona Cardinals seasons
Arizona Card